Annabella is a feminine given name.

Annabella may also refer to:

Annabella, County Cork, Ireland
Annabella, Utah, US
Annabella (actress), French film actress active from 1927 to 1952
Annabella, Italian women's magazine
Annabelle, Swiss women's magazine
"Annabella", a 1969 song by Aphrodite's Child from It's Five O'Clock
"Annabella", a 1970 song by Dave Dee, later a hit for Hamilton, Joe Frank & Reynolds from their 1971 debut album